Lecithocera contorta is a moth in the family Lecithoceridae. It was described by Chun-Sheng Wu and You-Qiao Liu in 1993. It is found in Sichuan, China.

The wingspan is 19–20 mm.

References

Moths described in 1993
contorta
Moths of Asia